Mendip may refer to:
Mendip District, a local government district of Somerset, England
Mendip Hills, a group of hills in Somerset, England
Mendip Way, a footpath across the Mendip Hills
Mendip TV Mast, a transmitter in the Mendips area
Forest of Mendip, an ancient forest in Somerset, England
Baron Mendip, a short-lived title of the Peerage of Great Britain
Welbore Ellis, 1st Baron Mendip (1713–1802)
Mendip Power Group, micro electricity generation in the Mendip area
Mendip Rail, freight operating railway company
HMS Mendip (L60), a Royal Navy destroyer

See also 
Chewton Mendip, a village in the Mendip Hills
Mendip Times, a monthly magazine in the Mendip and Somerset area
Mendip Vale railway station, western terminus of the East Somerset Railway
Mendips (disambiguation)